Combate is an Argentine reality show and an adaptation of the show "Combate Perú." Combate was broadcast for the first time on May 12, 2014, on the Argentine television station Canal 9. The show consists of two teams, one red and the other green, who compete among themselves in different challenges with the main goal of earning points for their teams.

Staff 
Hosts:

 Season 1-5: Guillermo "Fierita" Catalano and Thiago Batistuta were the hosts of the show from the first season to the fifth. In the fifth season, Joaquín "el Pollo" Álvarez was introduced as the host of a derivative program called "Fuera de Combate"
 Season 6: In the sixth season, Álvarez joined the show as a co-host together with Catalano and Batistuta. At the end of the sixth season, Catalano left the show.
 Season 7: In the seventh season, Laurita Fernández became Batistuta and Álvarez's new co-host. At the end of the seventh season, Thiago Batistuta left the show, leaving it to be hosted by Álvarez and Fernández.
 Season 10: In the middle of the tenth season, Álvarez left the show and was replaced by Juani Martínez.

Coaches:

 Héctor "Tito" Speranza is the lead coach since the first season.
 Carolina "Turca" Duer was a trainer in the first season together with Speranza.

Choreographers:

 Laura Fernández was the choreographer of the teams in the first two seasons.
 Kate Rodriguez was the choreographer in the third season.
 Antonella Campaniello was the choreographer from the seventh season to the last one (season 13).

Commentators:

 Florencia Ventura was the commentator during the first two seasons.
 Camila Salazar was introduced as commentator in the third season and stayed until the sixth.
 Estefania Berardi was introduced as commentator in season 13.

Other Staff:

 Mariano Flax had the role of an announcer called "El Jefe" (The Boss) from the first season to the last one (season 13).
 In season 2, Mauricio Trech was introduced as the show's mascot with the name "Eh Gato".

General information

Point System 
From the first season to the sixth, the teams competed every day to earn points and win the day.
From the seventh season onwards, the teams competed during the weekend. The points could range from 10 to 100 and were accumulated in a weekly basis. The teams also had a wild card that doubled the points. 
From the eighth season until season 13, the points could still range from 10 to 100, but the teams were no longer able to use the wild card.

Nomination and elimination 
From the first season to the sixth, the team that lost the day had to nominate one of its members for elimination. When the day of the elimination arrived, the 4 nominees had to compete in the games and the one who won was saved. The public saved another by voting through text message, and the last two had to submit to the vote of their peers. In case of a tie, the public made the decision.

In the seventh season, during the first three months of competition, the team that lost had to nominate two of its members, who would compete in the games. The loser was eliminated. But, after the fourth month, the rules changed and the losing team had to nominate a member each weekend, and the elimination round was at the end of the month. The 4 nominees would then compete in the games, and be voted for elimination or not through text message and the vote of their peers.

From the eighth season to the last one (season 13), the teams continued competing on the weekends, but the nominees became 3. Two were nominated by the losing team and the other one by the winning team. They competed in "El Eliminador," a game of questions and answers. The participant who won continued in the competition while the two who lost had to submit themselves to the vote of the public.

Penalties
Penalties could be applied if a participant arrived late for training, was disrespectful, or violated the show's regulations. Some applicable penalties were expulsions, suspensions, point removal, direct nomination, or losing the opportunity of participating in the following seasons. The penalty of expulsion was only used in the first and third seasons for physical violence.

Seasons

Regular season

Participants 
The following list shows participants who have participated throughout the seasons.

Up to now, there have been 124 participants (plus 11 celebrities). In addition, 23 of them have managed to win at least one season.

Argentine television shows